The 1912 Vermont gubernatorial election took place on September 3, 1912. Incumbent Republican John A. Mead, per the "Mountain Rule", did not run for re-election to a second term as Governor of Vermont. Republican candidate Allen M. Fletcher defeated Democratic candidate Harland B. Howe and Progressive candidate Fraser Metzger to succeed him. Since no candidate won a majority of the popular vote, the election was decided and Fletcher was elected by the Vermont General Assembly in accordance with the state constitution.

Results

References

Vermont
1912
Gubernatorial
September 1912 events